Princess Klementyna Czartoryska (1780–1852) was a Polish noblewoman, the author of a diary, which has been published.

She was the daughter of Józef Klemens Czartoryski and Dorota Barbara Jabłonowska. She married Prince Eustachy Erazm Sanguszko on 26 June 1798 in Slavuta and had three children: Dorota (1799-1831), Roman (1800-81), and Władysław (1803–70). Her husband, meanwhile, was having an affair with Julia Lubomirska.

When her spouse was accused of treason in 1810, she negotiated with the government and defended his rights. In 1813, she settled in Sławucie, where she collected a great library. She also founded the church St. Dorota in Sławucie. In 1830, she prevented the confiscation of the family property and her son's exile by her friendship with empress Alexandra. Her diary from 1832-35 was published in 1927.

Ancestors

References

1852 deaths
Klementyna
1780 births
People from Rivne Oblast
Polish diarists
19th-century Polish women writers
Women diarists
19th-century Polish nobility